is a Japanese manga series written and illustrated by Akane Torikai. It was serialized in Shogakukan's seinen manga magazine Weekly Big Comic Spirits from January 2019 to October 2022.

Publication
Shogakukan collected its chapters into individual tankōbon volumes. The first volume was released on June 28, 2019. As of October 28, 2022, eight volumes have been released.

Volume list

Reception
Saturn Return was one of the Jury Recommended Works at the 23rd Japan Media Arts Festival in 2020.

See also
Sensei's Pious Lie, another manga series by the same author

References

Further reading

External links
  

Seinen manga
Shogakukan manga